Horizon is a 1932 Soviet film directed by Lev Kuleshov.

Plot 
The film tells about the Jew Lev Horizon, who emigrated to the United States. There he joined the ranks of the army, went to Russia and transferred to the side of the Soviet army.

Starring 
 Nikolai Batalov as Lev Abramovich Horizon 
 Dmitriy Kara-Dmitriev as The Watchmaker  
 Nikolai Gladkov as Kid  
 Andrei Gorchilin as Monya  
 Sergey Komarov as Subofficer / American policeman / Priest  
 Yelena Kuzmina as  Rose, Isaak's Daughter 
 Mikhail Doronin as Isaak Horizon, Lev's Uncle 
 Mikhail Doller as Smith 
 Konstantin Khokhlov as Manufacturer
 Nikolai Kryuchkov as partisan  
 Andrei Fajt as officer
 Ye. Sheremetyeva as First Girl

References

External links 

1932 films
1930s Russian-language films
1932 drama films
Soviet drama films
Soviet black-and-white films
Films directed by Lev Kuleshov
Films about Jews and Judaism